Overland to Deadwood is a 1942 American Western film directed by William Berke and written by Paul Franklin. The film stars Charles Starrett, Russell Hayden, Cliff Edwards, Leslie Brooks, Norman Willis and Matt Willis. The film was released on September 25, 1942, by Columbia Pictures.

Plot

Cast          
Charles Starrett as Steve Prescott
Russell Hayden as Lucky Chandler
Cliff Edwards as Harmony Hobbs 
Leslie Brooks as Linda Banning
Norman Willis as Cash Quinlan
Matt Willis as Red Larson
Francis Walker as Vance
Lynton Brent as Clipper
June Pickerell as Mrs. Banning
Gordon De Main as George Bullock

References

External links
 

1942 films
1940s English-language films
American Western (genre) films
1942 Western (genre) films
Columbia Pictures films
Films directed by William A. Berke
American black-and-white films
1940s American films